Ollie Waldon is an American former Negro league third baseman who played in the 1940s.

Waldon played for the Chicago American Giants in 1944. In eight recorded games, he posted three hits in 20 plate appearances.

References

External links
 and Seamheads

Year of birth missing
Place of birth missing
Chicago American Giants players
Baseball third basemen